Gononotus is a genus of true weevils in the beetle family Curculionidae. There are at least two described species in Gononotus.

Species
These two species belong to the genus Gononotus:
 Gononotus angulicollis (Suffrian, 1871)
 Gononotus lutosus LeConte & J.L., 1876

References

Further reading

 
 
 

Molytinae
Articles created by Qbugbot